Ingrid Oliu (October 9, 1963-present) is an American actress. She played the role of Guadalupe "Lupe" Escobar in Stand and Deliver, voiced Renee Montoya in Batman: The Animated Series, and co-starred as Estela Garcia in the film Real Women Have Curves.

References

External links

Nytimes.com
Movies.yahoo.com

Living people
American film actresses
21st-century American women
1963 births